Katellen is an unincorporated community in Northampton County, Pennsylvania.  It is part of the Lehigh Valley metropolitan area, which had a population of 861,899 and was thus the 68th most populous metropolitan area in the U.S. as of the 2020 census.

History
Katellen was named for Kate Ellen Brodhead.

References

Unincorporated communities in Northampton County, Pennsylvania
Unincorporated communities in Pennsylvania